Mihajlovac is a village in the municipality of Smederevo, Serbia. According to the 2011 census, the village has a population of 2,674 people.

References

External links 

 Geographic coordinates: 

Populated places in Podunavlje District